The , known as the  for sponsorship reasons, is an annual one-match association football competition in Japan organised by J. League and the Japan Football Association (JFA). This competition serves as the season opener and is played between the reigning J1 League champions and the Emperor's Cup winners. Fuji Xerox have sponsored the competition since its inception in 1994 (rebranded as Fujifilm Business Innovation from April 2021). The match is usually played in February each year.

Participating clubs
Under the normal circumstances, the following clubs participate:
Defending J1 League champions
Defending Emperor's Cup winners

However, if one club wins both the J1 League and the Emperor's Cup, the J1 League runners-up will participate. Up to 2009, the Emperor's Cup runners-up would take the honor.

Competition format
Two halves of 45-minute match.
If tied, penalties would decide the winners. No extra time would be played.

Venues
 Tokyo National Stadium (1994–2004, 2006–2010, 2012–2014)
 International Stadium Yokohama (2005, 2011, 2015–2017, 2022)
 Saitama Stadium 2002 (2018–2021)

Results

* Since the 1998 Emperor's Cup winners Yokohama Flügels had been disbanded before the match, Shimizu S-Pulse as the runners-up qualified for the competition.
† The same club won both the league and the cup; the cup's runners-up qualified for the competition.
‡ The same club won both the league and the cup; the league's runners-up qualified for the competition.

Super Cup in JSL era
The Japanese Super Cup was also played during the Japan Soccer League (JSL) era from 1977 to 1984. However, it was never established as an independent competition as the second competition in 1978 was already served as a mere opening league match of the JSL. This previous Super Cup competition was taken less seriously than the current competition and made dormant after 8 years.  All matches were held in the National Stadium in Tokyo except for the 1978 and 1980 matches, both held in Osaka.

† The same club had won both the JSL and the Emperor's Cup in the previous year; therefore, the runners-up of the Cup qualified for the competition.

Performances

All-time 
Years in italic indicate Japan Soccer League seasons.

J.League era (1994–present)

See also

 Football in Japan
 Japan Football Association (JFA)

 Japanese association football league system
 League system
 J.League
 J1 League (I)
 J2 League (II)
 J3 League (III)
 Japan Football League (JFL) (IV)
 Japan Regional Football Champions League (promotion play-offs to JFL)
 Japanese Regional Leagues (V/VI)
 Emperor's Cup (national cup)
 J.League YBC Levain Cup (league cup)

References

External links
  Official Site (Japanese)
 Japan - List of Super Cup Finals, RSSSF.com

 
Supercup
Super
Japan
Fuji Xerox
Recurring sporting events established in 1977
1977 establishments in Japan